The Yengisogat range, also known as the Wesm Mountains, is a Chinese subrange of the Karakoram mountain range. It lies north of the Baltoro Muztagh, home of the eight-thousanders of the Karakoram. The highest peak is Huangguan Shan, or Crown Peak, 7,265 m (23,835 ft) (also sometimes given as 7,295 m/23,934 ft).

References
 Jill Neate, High Asia, The Mountaineers, 1989.
 Jerzy Wala, Orographical Sketch Map of the Karakoram, Swiss Foundation for Alpine Research, 1990.

Mountain ranges of Xinjiang